Tampa Padang Airport  is an airport near Mamuju, the capital city of the province of West Sulawesi on the island of Sulawesi in Indonesia.

Facilities

Airlines and destinations

References

Airports in Sulawesi
Transport in West Sulawesi